Casamarciano is a comune (municipality) in the  Metropolitan City of Naples in the Italian region Campania, located about  northeast of Naples.

Casamarciano borders the following municipalities: Avella, Cimitile, Comiziano, Nola, Tufino, Visciano.

References

Cities and towns in Campania